Frostetola is a genus of moths within the family Castniidae. It was described by José Oiticica Filho in 1955, and contains the single species Frostetola gramivora. It is known from Brazil.

References

Castniidae